McPhee Reservoir is located in Montezuma County, Colorado, United States. It was constructed and is operated by the United States Bureau of Reclamation as part of the Dolores Project, and dams the Dolores River to furnish municipal and irrigation water for Montezuma and Dolores counties and the Ute Mountain Ute Indian Reservation.

McPhee Reservoir is named for McPhee, Colorado, a company town founded by the New Mexico Lumber Company that is now submerged under the reservoir. In 1927, the McPhee sawmill produced over half of Colorado's lumber. The town housed up to 1,500 employees. The sawmill closed in 1946.

The lake itself may be accessed from near Dolores, Colorado, by state highways 145 and 184, and offers various boat-launching facilities, picnic areas, and campgrounds in the McPhee Recreation Area operated by the U.S. Forest Service. The lake fills the lower end of the Dolores Valley, with the dam completed in 1985 across Dolores Canyon.

McPhee Dam Powerplant
A hydroelectric powerplant operates at the dam. Called the McPhee Dam Powerplant, it uses two turbines to power a 1,300 kilowatt generator. The plant produces 7,170,000 kilowatt-hours annually.

See also
List of largest reservoirs of Colorado

References

External links

Dolores Water Conservancy District
Recreation.gov McPhee Reservoir

Former populated places in Montezuma County, Colorado
Reservoirs in Colorado
Ghost towns in Colorado
Company towns in Colorado
Protected areas of Montezuma County, Colorado
Historic American Buildings Survey in Colorado
Historic American Engineering Record in Colorado
Geography of Montezuma County, Colorado